Zarabe (variants: Zarab or Z'arabe) is the name given to the Muslim community of Réunion, who migrated in the mid-19th century. Zarabes are mostly South Asian, specifically from the modern state of Gujarat in India.

Etymology
The name is a Réunion Creole word derived from the French words les arabes meaning "the Arabs" (cf. Zoreilles derived from French les oreilles meaning "the ears"). These South Asian Muslims were not Arabs, but were described as such likely because of their liturgical use of the Arabic language.

See also
 Islam in Réunion
 Réunionnais of Indian origin
 Malbars
 Indians in France

References

External links
Indian Diaspora in Reunion

Indian diaspora in France

Ethnic groups in Réunion
Indian Muslims
Indian diaspora in Africa